José María Galante Serrano, best known as Chato Galante (27 April 1948 – 28 March 2020), was a Spanish pro-democracy activist.

Biography
Onetime political prisoner during the Franco era.
In 1968, he decided to dedicate his life to fight against Franco's dictatorship and was arrested for "illegal association and propaganda". He was 22 at the time. He was incarcerated at the DGS, where he was tortured by Antonio González Pacheco.
In 2010, he decided to participate in the complaint filed against the crimes committed during the dictatorship, with the help of Carlos Slepoy. In 2016, this complaint had 311 complainants.

He died from COVID-19 in March 2020, aged 71.

References

1948 births
2020 deaths
Deaths from the COVID-19 pandemic in Spain
Spanish politicians
Spanish torturees
Political activists
Spanish human rights activists
Spanish communists
Writers from Madrid